Prerna or Prerana is a Hindi/Sanskrit word which is derived from word "Prernah". Its translation is inspiration. 

It is a very popular girl name in Nepal, prevalent in Hinduism . 
Princess Prerana of Nepal, only daughter of King Gyanendra and Queen Komal

The name Prerna is the 68598th most popular baby name at mybabyname.com placing it in the top 95% of names by popularity.

References 

 Prerna

Feminine given names